Shikellamy School District is a midsized, suburban/rural, public school district in Northumberland County, Pennsylvania. It serves Northumberland Borough, Point Township, Rockefeller Township, Snydertown Borough, the City of Sunbury, and Upper Augusta Township. The administrative offices are located at Administration Center, 200 Island Blvd, Sunbury, Pennsylvania. According to 2000 federal census data, Per the US Census Bureau, by 2010, the district's population declined to 22,554 people. The educational attainment levels for the Shikellamy School District population 25 and over were 83.6% high school graduates and 15.3% college graduates.

According to the Pennsylvania Budget and Policy Center, 45% of the Shikellamie School District's pupils lived at 185% or below the Federal Poverty Level  as shown by their eligibility for the federal free or reduced price school meal programs in 2012. In 2013 the Pennsylvania Department of Education, reported that 37 students in the Shikellamy School District were homeless.

In 2009, the district residents’ per capita income was $16,811, while the median family income was $40,063. In the Commonwealth, the median family income was $49,501 and the United States median family income was $49,445, in 2010. In Northumberland County, the median household income was $41,208. By 2013, the median household income in the United States rose to $52,100. In 2014, the median household income in the U.S. was $53,700.

High school students may choose to attend the SUN Area Technical Institute for training in the construction and mechanical trades. The Central Susquehanna Intermediate Unit CSIU16 provides the district with a wide variety of services like: specialized education for disabled students; state mandated training on recognizing and reporting child abuse; speech and visual disability services; criminal background check processing for prospective employees and professional development for staff and faculty.

Schools
Shikellamy High School grades 9th-12th
Shikellamy Middle School (grades 6–8)
 Grace Beck Elementary School
 Chief Shikellamy Elementary School
 Oaklyn Elementary School
 Priestley Elementary School

Opened on September 6, 2016, the Shikellamy Middle School replaced the closed Sunbury Middle School and CW Rice Middle school, built on the site of the latter.

Extracurriculars
Shikellamy School District offers a wide variety of clubs, activities and an extensive sports program. The sports programs are through the Pennsylvania Heartland Athletic Conference. The Pennsylvania Heartland Athletic Conference is a voluntary association of 25 PIAA High Schools within the central Pennsylvania region.

Sports
The district funds:

Boys
Baseball - AAA
Basketball- AAA
Bowling - AAAA
Cross Country - AA
Football - AAA
Golf - AAA
Soccer - AA
Tennis - AA
Track and Field - AAA
Wrestling - AAA

Girls
Basketball - AAA
Bowling - AAAA
Cross Country - AA
Field Hockey - AA
Golf - AAA
Soccer (Fall) - AA
Softball - AAA
Swimming and Diving - AA *added 2015
Girls' Tennis - AA
Track and Field - AAA

Junior High School Sports

Boys
Basketball
Cross Country
Football
Soccer
Wrestling	

Girls
Basketball
Cross Country
Field Hockey
Soccer (Fall)
Softball 

According to PIAA directory July 2015

References

External links
 Shikellamy School District

Susquehanna Valley
School districts in Northumberland County, Pennsylvania